A Fermat's spiral or parabolic spiral is a plane curve with the property that the area between any two consecutive full turns around the spiral is invariant. As a result, the distance between turns grows in inverse proportion to their distance from the spiral center, contrasting with the Archimedean spiral (for which this distance is invariant) and the logarithmic spiral (for which the distance between turns is proportional to the distance from the center). Fermat spirals are named after Pierre de Fermat. 

Their applications include curvature continuous blending of curves, modeling plant growth and the shapes of certain spiral galaxies, and the design of variable capacitors, solar power reflector arrays, and cyclotrons.

Coordinate representation

Polar
The representation of the Fermat spiral in polar coordinates  is given by the equation

The two choices of sign give the two branches of the spiral, which meet smoothly at the origin. If the same variables were reinterpreted as Cartesian coordinates, this would be the equation of a parabola with horizontal axis, which again has two branches above and below the axis, meeting at the origin.

Cartesian
Using the polar equation for the spiral to eliminate  from these conversions produces parametric equations for the curve:

which generate the points of one branch of the curve as the parameter  ranges over the positive real numbers.

For any  generated in this way, dividing  by  cancels the  parts of the parametric equations, leaving the simpler equation . From this equation, substituting  by

Geometric properties

Division of the plane 
A complete Fermat's spiral (both branches) is a smooth double point free curve, in contrast with the Archimedean and hyperbolic spiral. Like a line or circle or parabola, it divides the plane into two connected regions.

Polar slope 
From vector calculus in polar coordinates one gets the formula

for the polar slope and its angle  between the tangent of a curve and the corresponding polar circle (see diagram).

For Fermat's spiral  one gets
 
Hence the slope angle is monotonely decreasing.

Curvature 
From the formula

 

for the curvature of a curve with polar equation  and its derivatives

one gets the curvature of a Fermat's spiral:

At the origin the curvature is 0. Hence the complete curve has at the origin an inflection point and the -axis is its tangent there.

Area between arcs 
 

After raising both angles by  one gets
 

Hence the area  of the region between two neighboring arcs is 
 only depends on the difference of the two angles, not on the angles themselves.

For the example shown in the diagram, all neighboring stripes have the same area: .

This property is used in electrical engineering for the construction of variable capacitors.

Special case due to Fermat 
In 1636, Fermat wrote a letter  to Marin Mersenne which contains the following special case:

The regions between neighboring curves (white, blue, yellow) have the same area . Hence:
 The area between two arcs of the spiral after a full turn equals the area of the circle .

Arclength 
The length of the arc of Fermat's spiral between two points  can be calculated by the integral:

 

This integral leads to an elliptical integral, which can be solved numerically.

The arc length of the positive branch of the Fermat's spiral from the origin can also be defined by hypergeometric functions  and the incomplete beta function :

Circle inversion 
The inversion at the unit circle has in polar coordinates the simple description .

 The image of Fermat's spiral  under the inversion at the unit circle is a lituus spiral with polar equation  When , both curves intersect at a fixed point on the unit circle.
 The tangent (-axis) at the inflection point (origin) of Fermat's spiral is mapped onto itself and is the asymptotic line of the lituus spiral.

The golden ratio and the golden angle
In disc phyllotaxis, as in the sunflower and daisy, the mesh of spirals occurs in Fibonacci numbers because divergence (angle of succession in a single spiral arrangement) approaches the golden ratio. The shape of the spirals depends on the growth of the elements generated sequentially. In mature-disc phyllotaxis, when all the elements are the same size, the shape of the spirals is that of Fermat spirals—ideally. That is because Fermat's spiral traverses equal annuli in equal turns. The full model proposed by H. Vogel in 1979 is

The angle 137.508° is the golden angle which is approximated by ratios of Fibonacci numbers.

The resulting spiral pattern of unit disks should be distinguished from the Doyle spirals, patterns formed by tangent disks of geometrically increasing radii placed on logarithmic spirals.

Solar plants

Fermat's spiral has also been found to be an efficient layout for the mirrors of concentrated solar power plants.

See also 
 List of spirals
 Patterns in nature
 Spiral of Theodorus

References

Further reading

External links
 
 Online exploration using JSXGraph (JavaScript)
 Fermat's Natural Spirals, in sciencenews.org

Spirals